In the Isle of Man, the Department of Local Government and the Environment or DLGE/DoLGE was responsible for the environment, social housing policy, local authorities, building control, health and safety, town planning, listed buildings and historic sites, waste disposal, conservation areas, management of the government estate, and provision of a Government Laboratory to monitor pollution, air and water quality, radioactivity and the Island's official mapping service.

The Department was replaced during the April 2010 Government restructure.

Previous Ministers for Local Government and the Environment
John Rimmington MHK, 2004-2006
Pamela Crowe MLC, 2002-2004
Walter Gilbey MHK, 1999-2002
Edgar Quine MHK, 1996-1999
Terry Groves MHK, 1994-1996
Tony Brown MHK, 1989-1994
Dominic Delaney MHK, 1986-1989

Previous Chairmen of the Local Government Board
Sir Miles Walker MHK, 1982-1986
Unknown, 1976-1982
Percy Radcliffe MHK, 1971-1976
Unknown, 1946-1976
John Cowin MLC, 1946-?
Unknown, 1922-1946
Lieutenant Governor of the Isle of Man, until 1922

External links
 https://web.archive.org/web/20080704075747/http://www.gov.im/dlge

Government of the Isle of Man
Environment of the Isle of Man